Franz Albert Amrhein (29 December 1870 – 20 May 1945) was a German rugby union player who competed in the 1900 Summer Olympics. He was a member of the German rugby union team, which won the silver medal. Germany was represented at the tournament by the FC 1880 Frankfurt rather than an official national team. Amrhein was the captain of the Frankfurt team at the event.

References

External links

 
 

1870 births
1945 deaths
German rugby union players
Rugby union players at the 1900 Summer Olympics
Olympic rugby union players of Germany
Olympic silver medalists for Germany
SC 1880 Frankfurt players
Rugby union number eights
Medalists at the 1900 Summer Olympics
Sportspeople from Frankfurt